Ahmose-Nebetta (alternatively written Ahmose-Nebta) ( “Child of Iah (the Moon) - Lady of the Land”) was a princess during the late Seventeenth Dynasty of Egypt. She was probably the daughter of Seqenenre Tao and Queen Ahhotep I.  She was the sister of Pharaoh Ahmose I.

Life
Ahmose-Nebetta was likely a daughter of Seqenenre Tao. She may have married her brother Ahmose I, but her sister Ahmose-Nefertari was the Great Royal Wife.

Her titles include King's Daughter and King's Sister. She is named on a statue of a prince Ahmose in the Louvre (E 15682). Two daughters of Ahhotep I, both named Ahmose, are named and they are thought to represent Ahmose-Nefertari and Ahmose-Nebetta. A statue of a princess at the Louvre (N 496) identifies her as a king's daughter, as a king's sister and as the daughter of Queen Ahhotep I.

Ahmose-Nebetta is depicted in the tomb of Inherkau (TT359) which dates to the 20th Dynasty as one of the "Lords of the West". She is shown in the top row behind Ahmose-Tumerisy and in front of Ahmose Sapair.

References

Princesses of the Seventeenth Dynasty of Egypt
16th-century BC women